Hatice Sultan ("respectful lady"; 5 April 1870 – 13 March 1938) was an Ottoman princess, the eldest daughter of Sultan Murad V and his third wife Şayan Kadın.

Early life
Hatice Sultan was born on 5 April 1870 her father's villa in Kurbağalıdere. Her father was Murad V, son of Abdulmejid I and Şevkefza Kadın, and her mother was Şayan Kadın. She was the third child, and eldest daughter of her father and the only child of her mother. At her conception, Pertevniyal Sultan, mother and Valide Sultan of Sultan Abdülaziz, ordered Şayan to have an abortion, because it was forbidden for the Ottoman princes at the time to have children before ascending the throne. However, Murad had already had two sons thanks to Abdülaziz's favour. This time Pertevniyal Sultan insisted that the rules be respected. Then Murad, with Abdülaziz's help, bribed the doctor to tell Pertevniyal that the abortion had been performed, while hiding Şayan in Murad's villa, where she gave birth and raised Hatice Sultan in secret until 1876 when Murad ascended the throne.

After Murad's accession to the throne on 30 May 1876, after the deposition of his uncle Abdulaziz, her family settled in Dolmabahçe Palace. After reigning for three months, he was deposed on 30 August 1876, due to mental instability and was imprisoned in Çırağan Palace by his half-brother Abdülhamid II. Hatice and her mother followed him into confinement. She was Murad V's favourite daughter.

Life in confinement

At the time of her family's confinement, Hatice Sultan was six years old. By the time she was ten, she was already a happy, laughing, joyful girl. She loved stories and would even make up her own endings to stories while listening to them, proving, in the worlds of Filitzen Hanim, both that she possessed a vivid imagination and that she was quite advanced for her age.

As she grew older her interests quickly became more apparent. She took up novels as soon as she learned to read. She would surreptitiously pick out the novels from among her father's books, now and then staying up all night reading them. Most of these novels were the works of French authors, since she had been taught French by her stepmother, Gevherriz Hanım as well as by her father. Gevherriz Hanım taught her to play the piano.

According to Filizten Hanım, Hatice Sultan was a bit too romantic by nature. She was so beautiful, that she could have been called "the star of the Princesses" of that day. She was sensitive, fiery, and an exuberant woman. Filitzen descrived her as very beautiful, lively and intelligent. Growing up she suffered greatly from her condition as a recluse and often complained saying: "What good does it do us to sit around here like this? Are we to become nothing but two old housekeepers here in this palace?".

First marriage
As years passed and Hatice matured into an adult, she quite openly longed for a husband. At length, her complaints came to her father's attention, thanks to her mother and the older kalfas. Murad had her complaints sent to Abdul Hamid II. The latter consider it his duty to find husbands for her and her half-sister Fehime Sultan, but on one condition, that once they leave the palace they may not return.

With that, the princesses were asked what they wished to do. Both preferred to leave Çırağan Palace and get married. Abdul Hamid had the two princesses brought up to Yıldız Palace. He ordered one of the villas at Ortaköy to be completely renovated and another new villa to be built. He had them completely furnished, then ordered photographs taken of them and sent the photographs to Murad.

In October 1898, she and her sister Fehime Sultan met with the German empress Augusta Victoria of Schleswig-Holstein, when the latter visited Istanbul with her husband the German emperor Wilhelm II. At that time the two were living at Yıldız Palace. Abdul Hamid realized that if he introduced his own daughters to the Empress but didn't include them they would feel quite hurt, so he had them participate in the ceremony as well.

Abdul Hamid decided to get Hatice married to Kabasakal Çerkes Mehmed Pasha, widower of princesses Naile Sultan, daughter of Abdulmejid I and Esma Sultan, daughter of Abdulaziz. However, the marriage didn't eventuate.

Finally in 1901, Abdul Hamid arranged her marriage together with her sister Fehime Sultan, and Sultan Abdulaziz's daughter Emine Sultan to one of her father's table servants who was given the title "Ali Vasıf Pasha, Code Scribe". The marriage took place on 3 September 1901 in the Yıldız Palace. The couple were given one of the palaces of Ortaköy as their residence. The marriage was extremely unhappy right from the start. Hatice locked the door to her apartments on their wedding night and did so every time her husband was at the Palace. However, the marriage was presumably consummated, as Hatice had a daughter, Ayşe Hanımsultan, whom her husband recognized as his.

Affair and divorce
Naime Sultan, the daughter of Sultan Abdul Hamid II had been a neighbour in the adjoining villa. Hatice Sultan had been having an affair for three years with her husband, Mehmed Kemaleddin Pasha. According to Filizten Hanım, they decided to have Naime Sultan, murdered so they could get married. This relationship was discovered in early 1904. The nature of the relationship is not known with certainty. According to Filitzen Hanim, Murad V's last consort, the relationship was consummated, while according to the son of the governor of Bursa, who was holding Kemaleddin under house arrest, it consisted only of letters thrown over the wall that separated their gardens and fleeting encounters. In any case, the scandal resonated not only in the Empire, but also in Europe and America (The New York Times reported the news on 25 May 1904). The two were eventually accused of wanting to poison their respective consorts in order to get married, and, according to Filitzan, the pain and shame for their favourite daughter led to Murad V's death. Hatice's feelings are also controversial. While Kemaleddin was surely in love with her (in his letters he frequently lamented her absence, asked when they could meet and if they could meet earlier than established, recounted that one time in which he slowed down in front of his villa to see her exit hers and get in the carriage), Filitzan and Hatice's granddaughter argue that seducing the husband of Naime, Abdülhamid II's favourite daughter, was just a way to take revenge for the wrongs she and her family had suffered from him who had imprisoned her father in Çırağan Palace for years, and didn't arrange her marriage until the age of thirty, and then married her to someone she never loved. Thus, the perfect way to take revenge was to ruin the marriage of Sultan's favourite daughter. According to other Hatice she still felt a sincere feeling, even if only relief from the escape from the unhappy marriage. In any case, when Kemaleddin, after the divorces, asked her to marry him, she refused them, out of pride, because "she did not accept the scraps of another princess" or because at that point she was already infatuated with who would become her second husband.

The resulting scandal angered Abdul Hamid. First he had Naime Sultan divorce her husband. Then he stripped Kemaleddin Pasha of all his military honours and exiled him to Bursa. Hatice's father, Murad, was a diabetic and already weakened by grief over the recent death of his youngest daughter Atiye Sultan, when he heard of the affair, the shock of his distress brought on his death a short time later.

Semih Mümtaz, whose father, the Governor of Bursa, was charged with guarding Kemaleddin Pasha in his internal exile, mentions nothing whatsoever about a plot to poison Naime, but rather claims that the affair between Hatice Sultan and Kemaleddin Pasha consisted of the exchange of love letters tossed over the garden wall, heated love letters on the part of the impulsive Kemaleddin Pasha. He claims Hatice Sultan had the Pasha's letters stolen and revealed to Abdul Hamid on purpose, in revenge for the poor husband the Sultan had chosen for her.

The Western press reported only that the Sultan's son-in-law had been arrested and sent into exile as a result of the secret correspondence between him and Hatice Sultan.

Abdul Hamid later forgave Hatice and she was invited again to Yıldız Palace, but he did not give her permission to divorce her hated husband. Hatice finally obtained permission to divorce only around 1908, when Abdülhamid II was deposed and replaced by Mehmed V, his younger half-brother.  With the declaration of the Second Constitutional Era in 1908, Kemaleddin Paşa was forgiven and returned to Istanbul to ask her to marry him; the princess refused.

Second marriage

After Hatice Sultan divorced Ali Vasıf Pasha, she married Rauf Hayreddin Bey (1871 – 1936), son of Hayri Bey on 11 May 1909. The two together had three children, Sultanzade Osman Bey, who died in infancy on 31 January 1911, Sultanzade Hayri Bey, born on 12 June 1912, and Selma Hanımsultan, born on 13 April 1916. Initially a love match, relationships soon soured and the two divorced in 1918. Eventually, Hatice settled in a mansion which he shared with Arife Kadriye Sultan, the granddaughter of one of his father's half-brothers. She also worked to help those of his father's consorts who, remained widows, had been freed by Çırağan Palace but reduced to poverty due to the reduction or suspension of their salaries. She hosted Nevdürr Hanim in her home and wrote several times to ensure that the others were given enough income to lead a comfortable life.

Philanthropy
In 1912, the "Hilal-i Ahmer Centre for Women" was organised within the "Ottoman Hilal-i Ahmer Association", a foundation established in 1877 to provide medical care in Istanbul and surrounding communities. In May 1915, during the Gallipoli Campaign, as the member of this organisation, Hatice visited the Kadırga hospital distributing handkerchiefs and cigarettes amongst 
the soldiers and donated tea and sugar to the hospital.

Life in exile and death

At the exile of the imperial family in March 1924, Hatice Sultan and her two children settled in Beirut, Lebanon. In exile, the three of them lived on the alimony sent by her former husband Rauf Bey. However, when he was mixed up in a smuggling plot, dismissed from his job and put in prison, they were left with no money.

In 1932, a double match was made for two princesses of the Ottoman family living in France, the princesses Dürrüşehvar Sultan and Nilüfer Hanımsultan. The Nizam of Hyderabad, at the time considered the richest man in the world, had won their hand in marriage for his two sons. After a simple wedding in the South of France, the two brides went off to live in India. In her straitened circumstances, Hatice was under a lot of pressure to get her daughter married, the sooner the better. But it had become very hard to find suitable marriage partners for impoverished Turkish royalty. About five years later, a husband for Selma was found in India. Selma travelled to India to marry Syed Sajid Husain Ali, Raja of Kotwara, in 1937. 

Hatice was then on alimony sent by the Raja, her son-in-law. The philosopher Rıza Tevfik visited her in the 1930s and, although she was not young any more and living in a little house, he found her still very beautiful and dignified. She suffered a stroke, and died in poverty eventually on 13 March 1938, at the age of sixty-seven. She was buried in the cemetery of the Sulaymaniyya Takiyya in Damascus, Syria.

Honours

 Order of the House of Osman
 Order of Charity, 1st Class

Issue

In literature and popular culture
In the 2012 movie The Sultan's Women, Hatice Sultan is portrayed by Turkish actress Melike Günal Kurtulmuş.
In the 2017 TV series Payitaht: Abdülhamid, Hatice Sultan is portrayed by Turkish actress Gözde Kaya.
Hatice Sultan is a character in Ayşe Osmanoğlu's historical novel The Gilded Cage on the Bosphorus (2020).
Hatice Sultan is a character in Kenizé Mourad's historical novel Regards from the Dead Princess (1987).

Ancestry

See also
 List of Ottoman princesses

References

Sources
 
 
 
 

1870 births
1938 deaths
Royalty from Istanbul
19th-century Ottoman princesses
20th-century Ottoman princesses
Burials in the cemetery of the Sulaymaniyya Takiyya